The opening ceremony of the 2019 Pan American Games took place on Friday July 26, 2019 at the Estadio Nacional del Perú (Pan Am Ceremonies Venue) in Lima, Peru and ran from 20:00 to 23:05 PET. The ceremony was entitled Amazing Peru and featured a stage designed as Pariacaca, the sacred mountain of Lima. It was produced by Italian company Balich Worldwide Shows and directed by creative director Francisco Negrin.

Proceedings

Countdown
The ceremony began with countdown numbers from 30 to zero. In the last 17 numbers, the mountain part of the stage generated colours of the logos of the previous Pan American Games. Afterwards, the volunteers ran to the centre of the stage, forming the logo of the event.

Prelude
Afterwards, the President of Panam Sports Neven Ilic and the President of the Republic of Peru Martin Vizcarra were introduced to the crowd. Dancers performed a choreography corresponding to the poem “El Perú” by Marco Martos, expressed in all the 49 languages of Peru including Spanish. Afterwards, they joined together and sang the National Anthem in both spoken and sign language, while the national flag was raised by Peruvian Armed Forces personnel after being brought in earlier.

This was followed by an introductory performance with three segments, the first being "The Calling" which represents the call of god Pariacaca for 41 member nations of Pan Am Sports to participate in the sporting event. The second segment, "Dawn" represents the scenery of Lima at dawn. The segment was further divided into two parts: Pacific and Amancaes. The Pacific part represents the Pacific ocean which borders Peru, while the Amances part represents amancaes flowers, the floral symbol of Lima and the namesake local festival. Rocío Larrañaga the surfer featured in the Pacific part of the Dawn segment. In the third segment, "Sports", Cajones gather on the stadium's stage and play music, during which the sports pictograms appeared on the stage on the mountain and Charlie Parra playing guitar. The segment concluded with performance of the official song of the games: "Jugamos Todos" by Guillermo Bussinger, Pelo D’Ambrosio, Sandra Muente and Shantall with the cajones forming the Games' mascot, Milco.

Parade of Nations 

During the Parade of Nations, each country's team marched into the stadium, preceded by a person dressed as Ekeko – the Tiwanakan (pre Columbian civilization) god of abundance and prosperity. The Caral stage reproduced the colours of the corresponding national flag, while the screen on the mountain displayed the natural scenery of each participating nations of the games. When each team arrived at the center, the whole mountain showed the natural scenery of each team’s country. As per tradition, the national team of Argentina, the country of origin of the Pan American Games entered first, while Peru as the host nation entered last. Other teams entered based on the names of countries in Spanish language.

Main event 
Soon afterwards was the creative segments, divided into five parts: 
 Pago a la tierra or Payment to the Earth – a segment which celebrates the ritual of the same name frequently practiced in the Peruvian Andes in which people offer a series of tributes such as food to goddess Pachamama or Mother Earth. 
 Superfoods – a segment which celebrates Peruvian Gastronomy and depict the food crops found in the country and its local cuisine, featuring Chef Micha Tsamura. 
 Looms – a segment which celebrates Loom as an equipment used to weave textiles using wool and cottons.
 The cutting edge – a segment which celebrates clothes that made out of Peru's fabrics, featuring electric violinist Pauchi Sasaki.
 Streets – a segment which celebrates the modern everyday life of Peru, featuring virtual duet performance of “La flor de la canela" by Juan Diego Flórez and late singer Chabuca Granda.

The Panam Sports flag was carried by former Peruvian sportsmen including Gladys Euesbio, Roberto Abugattas, Raul Pacheco, Natalia Cuglievan, Luis Minamy, Carlos Zegarra and Monica Liyau and raised to the Panam Sport anthem by the armed forces.

"Dear friends of the 41 countries of the Americas and the world, Welcome to the biggest sports party on the continent. Peru, land of great cultures and an ancient history, welcomes you with open arms. It is an honour for me to inaugurate the 18th Pan American Games Lima 2019".
- Martin Vizcarra, President of the Republic of Peru, declaring the Games open in Spanish.

After speeches by Carlos Neuhaus and Neven Ilic, the President of the Republic of Peru declares the Games open.

During the relay segment, the cauldron based on an Incan sun appeared on top of the mountain after a ray of light was shot on it. The torch was carried into the stadium by Peruvian sportsmen, Olympic athletics medallist Edith Moeding. He passed on the torch to two young athletes: judo's Ariana Balterzar Minan and tennis player Carlos Fernandez and Volleyball player Lucha Fuentes. Lucha handed the torch to last torch bearer and Seoul 1988 Summer Olympics women volleyball silver medalist team member–Cecilia Tait who lit the cauldron. The ceremony concluded with Puerto Rican international star Luis Fonsi performing seven songs which are "Imposible", "Calypso", "Échame La Culpa", "Date La Vuelta", "No Me Doy Por Vencido", "Party Animal" and global hit song at the time – Despacito. (Since 4 August 2017, Despacito's music video was the most-viewed YouTube video, until it was overtaken by Pinkfong's Baby Shark Dance on 1 November 2020.)

List of performers
 Guillermo Bussinger, Pelo D’Ambrosio, Sandra Muente and Shantall 
 Juan Diego Flórez 
  Luis Fonsi

Dignitaries
 Thomas Bach, President of the International Olympic Committee
 Neven Ilić Álvarez, Panam Sports President
 Martín Vizcarra, President of Peru
 Carlos Neuhaus, President of the Organizing Committee of the Lima 2019 Pan American and Parapan American Games
 Jorge Muñoz, Mayor of Lima

See also
 2019 Pan American Games closing ceremony

References

External links

 Media guide 
 

Opening ceremony
Pan American Games opening ceremonies
Ceremonies in Peru